

Ecgbald was a medieval Bishop of Winchester. He was consecrated between 759 and 778. He died between 781 and 784.

Citations

References

External links
 

Bishops of Winchester
8th-century English bishops
780s deaths
Year of birth unknown
Year of death uncertain